The marine molluscs of Venezuela are a part of the molluscan fauna of Venezuela. The marine molluscs are the snails, clams and mussels, chitons, octopuses, squid and cuttlefish that live in marine and estuarine habitats. The freshwater and land molluscs are not included in this list.

This is a partial list of the marine molluscs of Venezuela. The families are listed alphabetically within the classes.

Statistics

Class Polyplacophora

Suborder Acanthochitonina

Acanthochitonidae
Americhiton andersoni (Watters, 1981)
Americhiton balesae (Abbott, 1954)
Acanthochitona pygmaea (Pilsbry, 1893)
Acanthochitona retrojecta (Pilsbry, 1893)
Acanthochitona venezuelana Lyons, 1988

Suborder Chitonina

Chaetopleuridae
Chaetopleura apiculata (Say, 1834)
Lepidochitona liozonis (Dall & Simpson, 1901)

Chitonidae

Acanthopleura granulata (Gmelin, 1791)
Chiton marmoratus Gmelin, 1791
Chiton squamosus Linnaeus, 1764
Chiton tuberculatus Linnaeus, 1758
Rhyssoplax janeirensis (Gray, 1828)

Ischnochitonidae
Callistochiton portobelensis Ferreira 1976
Ceratozona squalida (Adams, 1845)
Ischnochiton hartmeyeri Thiele, 1916
Ischnochiton papillosus (Adams, 1845)
Ischnochiton striolatus (Gray, 1829)
Stenoplax boogii (Haddon, 1886)
Stenoplax purpurascens (Haddon, 1886)

Class Scaphopoda

Order Dentaliida

Dentaliidae
Dentalium laqueatum A. E. Verrill, 1885
Graptacme semistriolata (Guilding, 1834)
Fissidentalium 
Paradentalium americanum Philippi, 1843

Laevidentaliidae
Laevidentalium

Order Gadilida

Gadilidae
Gadila dominguensis (d'Orbigny, 1853)
Polyschides tetraschistus (Watson, 1879)

Class Gastropoda

Superfamily Acteonoidea

Aplysiidae

Aplysia brasiliana Rang, 1828
Aplysia cervina (Dall & Simpson, 1901)
Aplysia dactylomela Rang, 1828
Aplysia juliana Quoy & Gaimard, 1832
Aplysia parvula Mörch, 1863 3
Bursatelle pleii Rang, 1828

Superfamily Architectonicoidea

Architectonicidae
Architectonica nobilis Röding, 1798
Heliacus bisulcatus Orbigny, 1842
Heliacus cylindricus (Gmelin, 1791)

Superfamily Buccinoidea

Buccinidae
Engina turbinella (Kiener, 1835)
Engoniophos unicinctus (Say, 1845)
Pallacera guadalupensis (Petit, 1852)
Pisania lineata (Conrad, 1846)
Pisania pusio (Linnaeus, 1758)

Columbellidae
Suturoglypta pretrii (Reeve, 1849)
Parvanachis obesa (Adams, 1845)
Costoanachis catenata (Sowerby, 1844)
Costoanachis hotessieriana (Orbigny, 1842)
Anachis plicatulum (Dunker, 1857)
Anachis pulchella (Blainville, 1829)
Costoanachis semiplicata Stearns, 1873
Costoanachis sertulariarum (d'Orbigny, 1842)
Costoanachis sparsa (Reeve, 1859)
Columbella mercatoria Linnaeus, 1758
Mazatlania cosentini (Philippi, 1836)
Mitrella albella (Adams, 1850)
Mitrella fenestrata (Adams, 1850)
Astyris lunata (Say, 1826)
Mitrella ocellata (Gmelin, 1791)
Nitidella dichroa Sowerby 1858
Nitidella nitida (Lamarck, 1822))
Rhombinella laevigata (Linnaeus, 1758)
Strombina pumilio (Reeve, 1859))

Fasciolariidae

Aristofusus excavatus (Sowerby II, 1880)
Fasciolaria tulipa (Linnaeus, 1758)
Fasciolaria tulipa hollisteri (Weisbord, 1962)
Barbarofusus barbarensis (Trask, 1855)  (Introduced species)
Fusinus bitteri Gibson-Smith
Lyonsifusus carvalhoriosi Macsotay & Campos, 2001
Aristofusus couei  (Petit de la Saussaye, 1853)
Aristofusus helenae Bartsch, 1939
Fusinus howelli Clench & Aguayo, 1940
Fusinus dilectus Weisbord, 1962
Lyonsifusus martinezi Macsotay & Campos, 2001
Fusinus veatchi (Maury, 1917)
Heilprinia timessa (Dall, 1889)
Hemipolygona mcgintyi (Pilsbry, 1939)
Polygona angulata (Röding, 1798)
Polygona infundibulum (Gmelin, 1791)
Leucozonia nassa (Gmelin, 1791)
Leucozonia ocellata (Gmelin, 1791)
Lyonsifusus ansatus (Gmelin, 1791)
Marmorofusus verrucosus (Gmelin, 1791) (Introduced species)
Triplofusus papillosus (Sowerby I, 1825)

Melongenidae

Melongena melongena (Linnaeus, 1758)
Melongena corona (Gmelin, 1791)
Pugilina morio (Linnaeus, 1758)

Pisaniidae
Gemophos auritulus (Link, 1807)
Gemophos tinctus (Conrad, 1846)

Superfamily Bulloidea

Bullidae

Bulla striata Bruguière, 1792
Bulla striata occidentalis Adams, 1850
Bulla solida (Gmelin, 1791)

Retusidae
Purunculus caelatus Bush 1885
Retusa bullata Kiener, 1834
Retusa candei (Orbigny, 1842)
Retusa sulcata (Orbigny, 1842)
Ryzorus ozyllatus Bush, 1885
Volvulella persimilis Mörch, 1875

Superfamily Calyptraeoidea

Calyptraeidae
Calyptraea centralis (Conrad, 1841)
Cheilea equestris (Linnaeus, 1758)
Crepidula aculeata (Gmelin, 1791)
Crepidula convexa Say, 1822
Crepidula incurva (Broderip, 1834)
Crepidula plana Say, 1822
Crepidula rostrata Adams, 1852
Crucibulum auricula (Gmelin, 1791)
Crucibulum marense Weisbordn 1962
Crucibulum striatum (Say, 1828)

Superfamily Cavolinioidea

Cavoliniidae
Cavolinia longirostris (Blainville, 1821)
Cavolinia trispinosa (Blainville, 1821)
Diacria trispinosa (Blainville, 1821)

Creseidae
Creseis acicula Rang, 1828

Superfamily Cerithioidea

Cerithiidae
Cerithium algicola Adams, 1848
Cerithium atratum (Born, 1778)
Cerithium eburneum Bruguière, 1792
Cerithium guinaicum Philippi, 1849
Cerithium litterattum (Born, 1778)
Cerithium lutosum Menke, 1828
Diastoma varium (Pfeiffer, 1840)

Modulidae
Trochomodulus carchedonius (Lamarck, 1822)
Modulus cerodes (Adams, 1851)  (Introduced species)
Modulus modulus (Linnaeus, 1758)

Planaxidae
Planaxis lineatus (Da Costa, 1778)
Planaxis nucleus (Bruguière, 1789)

Potamididae
Cerithidea costata (Da Costa, 1778)
Cerithidea scalariformis (Say, 1825)
Batillaria minima (Gmelin, 1791)

Scaliolidae
Finella dubia (d’Orbigny, 1840)

Turritellidae

Turritella acropa Dall, 1889
Turritella exolea (Linnaeus, 1758)
Turritella maiquetiana (Weisbord, 1962)
Turritella paraguanensis F. Hodson, 1926
Turritella variegata (Linnaeus, 1758)

Superfamily Conoidea

Conidae
Conus auranius Bruguière, 1872
Conus austini Rehder y Abbott, 1951
Conus brasiliensis Clench, 1942
Conus capricorni Van Mol, Tursch & Kenp, 1967
Conus centurio Born, 1778
Conus dominicanus Hwass, 1782
Conus erminius Born, 1778
Conus fostery Clench & Aguayo, 1942
Conus granulatus Linnaeus, 1758
Conus jaspideus Gmelin, 1791
Conus jaspideus pygmaeus Reeve, 1844
Conus juliae Clench, 1942
Conus multiliratus mukltiliratus Bose, 1906
Conus mus Hwass, 1792
Conus patricius Hinds, 1843
Conus puncticulatus Hwass, 1792
Conus regius Gmelin, 1791
Conus spurius Gmelin, 1791
Conus spurius atlanticus Clench, 1942
Conus stimpson Dall, 1902
Conus villepini Fischer & Bernardi, 1857
Conus vitatus Hwass in Bruguière, 1792

Drilliidae
Agladrillia
Syntomodrillia biconica Weisbord, 1962
Syntomodrillia lisotropis Dall
Pleurotomella

Terebridae
Strioerebrum concavum (Say, 1822)
Strioerebrum dislocatum (Say, 1825)
Strioerebrum protextum (Conrad, 1845)
Terebra arca Abbott, 1954
Terebra cinerea (Born, 1778)
Terebra dislocata (Say,1822)
Terebra hastata (Gmelin 1791)
Terebra protexta Conrad 1845
Terebra salleana (Deshayes, 1859)
Terebra taurina Lightfoot, 1786

Superfamily Cylichnoidea

Cylichnidae
Acteocina bullata (Kiener, 1834)
Acteocina canaliculata (Say, 1822)
Acteocina candey (Orbigny, 1842)
Cylichna caelata (Bush, 1885)

Superfamily Cypraeoidea

Cypraeidae

Cypraea cinerea Gmelin, 1791
Cypraea spurca acicularis Gmelin, 1791
Cypraea zebra Linnaeus, 1758
Siphocypraea mus Linnaeus, 1758

Eratoidae
Trivia candidula Gaskoin, 1835
Trivia matbiana Schwengel y Mcgynty, 1942
Trivia pediculus (Linnaeus, 1758)
Trivia suffusa (Gray, 1832)

Ovulidae

Cyphoma intermedium (Sowerby I, 1828) 
Cyphoma gibbosum (Linnaeus, 1758)
Cyphoma christahemmenae (Fehse, 1997)
Cyphoma signatum Pilsbry y Mcgynty, 1939
Cymbovula acicularis (Lamarck, 1810)
Simnia rufa (Sowerby I, 1832)
Simnialena uniplicata (Sowerby II, 1848)

Superfamily Doridoidea

Dorididae
Glossodoris bayeri Marcus y Marcus, 1967

Superfamily Eoacmaeoidea

Eoacmaeidae
Eoacmaea pustulata (Helbling, 1779)

Superfamily Ellobioidea

Ellobiidae
Detracia bulloides (Motangu, 1808)
Melampus coffeus (Linnaeus, 1758)
Melampus monile (Bruguière, 1789)
Pedipes mirabilis (Mühlfeld, 1816)
Tralia ovula (Bruguière, 1789)

Superfamily Epitonioidea

Epitoniidae
Epitonium albidum (d'Orbigny, 1842)
Epitonium arnoldoi Dall, 1917
Epitonium denticulatun (Sowerby II, 1844)
Epitonium lamellosum (Lamarck, 1822)
Jantina globosa Swainson, 1822
Scalina mitchelli (Dall, 1896)

Superfamily Ficoidea

Ficidae

Ficus communis Röding, 1798
Ficus ventricosus Sowerby I, 1825

Superfamily Fissurelloidea

Fissurellidae

Diodora arcuata (Sowerby II, 1862)
Diodora aspera (Rathke, 1833)
Diodora cayenensis (Lamarck, 1822)
Diodora dysoni (Reeve, 1850)
Diodora jaumei Aguayo y Rehder, 1936
Diodora listeri (Orbigny, 1842)
Diodora minuta (Lamark, 1822)
Diodora sayi (Dall, 1899)
Diodora variegata (Sowerby II, 1862)
Diodora viridula (Lamarck, 1822)
Emarginula pumila (Adams, 1851)
Emarginula dentigera Heilprin, 1889
Fissurella angusta Gmelin, 1791
Fissurella barbadensis Gmelin, 1791
Fissurella fascicularis Lamark, 1822
Fissurella nimbosa Linnaeus, 1758
Fissurella nodosa (Born, 1778)
Fissurella rosea  (Gmelin, 1796)
Hemitoma octoradiata (Gmelin, 1791)
Lucapina philippiana (Finlay, 1930)
Lucapina sowerbii (Sowerby I, 1835)
Lucapina suffusa (Reeve, 1850) 
Lucapinella henseli (Von Martens, 1890)
Lucapinella limatula (Reeve, 1850)

Superfamily Haliotoidea

Haliotidae

Haliotis pourtalesii Dall, 1881

Superfamily Haminoeoidea

Haminoeidae
Atys riiseana (Mörch, 1875)
Atys sharpi Vannata 1901

Haminoeidae
Haminoea antillarum (Orbigny, 1841)
Haminoea elegans (Gray, 1925)
Haminoea succinea (Conrad, 1846)
Scaphander watsoni Dall, 1869

Superfamily Littorinoidea

Littorinidae
Albania auberiana  (Orbigny, 1842)
Cingula floridana (Rheder, 1943)
Cingula floridana (Pfeiffer, 1839)
Littoraria angulifera (Lamarck, 1822)
Echinolittorina angustior Mörch, 1876
Littoraria flava King & Broderip, 1832
Echinolittorina lineolata Orbigny, 1840
Echinolittorina meleagris (Potiez y Michaud, 1838)
Littoraria nebulosa (Lamarck, 1822)
Littorina tesellata Philippi, 1847
Echinolittorina ziczac (Gmelin, 1791)
Echinolittorina tuberculata (Menke, 1828)
Schwartziella bryerea (Montagu, 1803)
Phosinella cancellata (Philippi, 1847)
Zebinella decussata  (Montagu, 1803)
Cenchritis muricatus (Linnaeus, 1758)
Truncatella caribaeensis Reeve, 1842
Zebina browniana (Orbigny, 1842)

Naticidae

Natica marochiensis (Gmelin, 1791)
Naticarius canrena (Linnaeus, 1758)
Polinices hepaticus (Röding, 1798)
Polinices lacteus (Guilding, 1834)
Sinum maculatum (Say, 1831)
Sinum perspectivum (Say, 1831)
Stigmaulax cayennensis Récluz, 1850
Stigmaulax sulcatus (Born, 1778)
Tectonatica pusilla Say, 1822

Nassariidae
Phrontis alba Say, 1822
Nassarius coppingeri (Smith, 1881)
Phrontis karinae Nowell-Usticke, 1959

Phrontis polygonata Lamarck, 1822
Phrontis vibex (Say, 1822)
Pallacera unicinta (Say, 1826)

Superfamily Lottioidea

Lottiidae

Lottia albicosta (Adams, 1845)
Lottia antillarum (G.B. Sowerby I, 1831)
Lottia jamaicensis (Gmelin, 1791)
Lottia leucopleura (Gmelin, 1791)

Superfamily Muricoidea

Muricidae

Babelomurex mansfieldi (McGinty, 1940)
Calotrophon ostrearum (Conrad, 1846)
Calotrophon velero (Vokes, 1970)
Chicoreus brevifrons Lamarck, 1822
Chicoreus spectrum (Reeve, 1846)
Claremontiella nodulosa (Adams, 1845)
Coralliophila caribaea Abbott, 1958
Coralliophila erosa (Röding, 1822)
Dermomurex parperculus (Adams, 1853)
Dermomurex pauperculus (Adams, 1850)
Favartia alveata (Kiener, 1842)
Favartia cellulosa (Conrad, 1846)
Favartia macgintyi M. Smith, 1938
Mexacanthina angelica Oldroyd, 1918<
Morutla gilbertharrisi (Weisbord, 1962)
Murex erhysostoma  Sowerby II, 1834
Murex olssoni Vokes, 1967
Muricopsis perexigua (Maury, 1917)
Muricopsis rosea (Reeve, 1856)
Muricopsis rosea (Reeve, 1856)
Ocenebra intermedia (Adams, 1850)
Phyllonotus margaritensis Abbott, 1958
Phyllonotus margaritensis Abbott, 1958
Phyllonotus pomum Gmelin,1791
Plicopurpura patula Linnaeus, 1758
Poirieria recticanlis (Weisbord, 1962)
Siratus beauii (Fisher & Bernarldi 1957)
Siratus formosus Sowerby II, 1841
Siratus springeri Bullis, 1964
Stramonita floridana (Conrad, 1837)
Stramonita haemastoma (Linnaeus,, 1767)
Stramonita haemastoma Linnaeus, 1767)
Thais melones (Duclos, 1832)
Thais rustica (Lamarck, 1822)
Thaisella coronata (Guppy, 1869)
Trachypollia didyma (Schwengel, 1943)
Typhina belcheri (Broderip, 1833)
Typhina expansa Sowerby II, 1874
Typhis bullasi (Gertman, 1969)
Vasula deltoidea (Lamarck, 1822)
Vokesimurex cabritii (Bemardi, 1859)
Vokesimurex chrysostoma Sowerby II, 1834
Vokesimurex donmoorei (Bullis, 1964)
Vokesimurex messorius Sowerby II, 1841
Vokesimurex recurvirostris (Broderip, 1832)

Superfamily Mitroidea

Mitridae
Neotiara nodulosa (Gmelin, 1791)

Neogastropoda

Babyloniidae

Babylonia areolata (Link, 1807) (Introduced species)

Superfamily Neritoidea

Neritidae

Nerita amplisulcata Macsotay & Campos, 2001
Nerita fulgurans Gmelin, 1791
Nerita peloronta Linnaeus, 1758
Nerita tessellata Gmelin, 1791
Nerita versicolor Gmelin, 1791
Neritina meleagris Lamarck, 1822
Neritina piratica Russel, 1940
Nereina punctulata (Lamarck, 1816)
Neritina reclivata (Say, 1822)
Neritina virginea (Linnaeus, 1758)
Puperita pupa (Linnaeus, 1767)
Smaragdia viridis (Linnaeus, 1758)

Phenacolepadidae
Plesiothyreus hamillei (Fischer, 1857)

Superfamily Olivoidea

Olividae

Eburna glabrata (Linnaeus, 1758)
Amalda tankervillii (Linnaeus, 1758)
Jaspidella jaspidea (Gmelin, 1791)
Oliva scripta Lamarck, 1811
Americoliva reticularis (Lamarck, 1810)
Americoliva sayana Ravanel, 1834
Oliva semmelinki Weisbord, 1962
Olivella acteocina Olson 1956
Olivella dealbata (Reeve, 1850)
Olivella fundarugata Weisbord, 1962
Olivella kifos Macsotay & Campos, 2001
Olivella lactea (Marrat, 1871)
Olivella minuta (Link, 1807)
Olivella mutica (Say, 1822)
Olivella nivea (Gmelin, 1791)
Olivella petiolita (Duclos, 1857)
Olivella perplexa Olson 1956

Superfamily Philinoidea

Philinidae
Philine sagra (Orbigny, 1842)

Superfamily Pyramidelloidea

Amathinidae
Iselica globosa (H. C. Lea, 1843)

Pyramidellidae
Odostomia mareana Weisbord, 1962
Fargoa bartschi Stimpson, 1851
Longchaeus candidus (Mörch, 1875)
Pyramidella dolabrata Linnaeus, 1758
Turbonilla hemphilli Bush, 1899

Superfamily Ringiculoidea

Ringiculidae
Ringicula semistriata (Orbigny, 1842)

Superfamily Rissooidea

Rissoinidae
Alvania auberiana (Orbigny, 1842)
Phosinella cancellata (Philippi, 1847)
Schwartziella fischeri (Desjardin, 1949)
Schwartziella bryerea (Montagu, 1803)
Zebinella decussata (Montagu, 1803)
Zebina browniana (Orbigny, 1842)

Superfamily Scissurelloidea

Scissurellidae
Anatoma proxima (Dall 1927)

Siphonariidae
Siphonaria alternata (Say, 1826)
Siphonaria naufragum (Stearns, 1872)
Siphonaria pectinata (Linnaeus, 1758)

Superfamily Stromboidea

Strombidae

Lobatus costatus (Gmelin, 1791)
Aliger gallus (Linnaeus, 1758)
Aliger gigas (Linnaeus, 1758)
Lobatus raninus (Gmelin, 1791)
Strombus pugilis Linnaeus, 1758
Strombus pugilis nicaraguensis Fluck, 1905

Superfamily Tonnoidea

Bursidae
Bursa bufonia (Gmelin, 1791)
Bursa corrugata (Perry, 1811)
Bursa granularis (Orbigny, 1842)
Bursa granularis cubaniana (Orbigny, 1842)
Bursa spadicea (Momfort, 1810)

Cassidae
Cassis flammea (Linnaeus, 1758)
Cassis madagascariensis Lamarck, 1822
Cassis tuberosa (Linnaeus, 1758)
Cypraecassis testiculus (Linnaeus, 1758)
Dalium solidum (Dall, 1889)
Morum dennisoni Reeve, 1844
Morum dennison Meuschen, 1787
Phalium granulatum (Born, 1778)
Sconsia grayi (Lamarck, 1816)

Cymatiidae

Cymatium etcheversi Macsotay & Campos 2001a
Cymatium femorale (Linnaeus, 1758)
Distorsio clathrata (Lamarck, 1816)
Gutturnium muricinum (Röding, 1798)
Linatella caudata (Gmelin, 1791)
Monoplex krebsii (Mörch, 1877)
Monoplex nicobaricus (Röding, 1798)
Monoplex parthenopeus (Von Salis, 1793)
Monoplex pilearis martinianum Orbigny, 1842
Monoplex pilearis (Linnaeus, 1758)
Monoplex vespaceus (Lamarck, 1822)
Ranularia cynocephala (Lamarck, 1816)
Turritriton labiosus Wood, 1828

Tonnidae

Tonna galea (Linnaeus, 1758)
Tonna pennata (Mörch, 1852)

Superfamily Truncatelloidea

Caecidae
Caecum floridanum Stimpson, 1851
Caecum heptagonum Carpenter, 1858
Caecum imbricatum Carpenter, 1858
Caecum pulchellum Stimpson, 1851
Caecum regulare Carpenter, 1858
Caecum ryssotitum Folin, 1867
Caecum textile Folin, 1867
Meioceras cornucopiae Carpenter, 1859
Meioceras nitidum (Stimpson, 1851)

Superfamily Triphoroidea

Cerithiopsidae
Bittum caraboboense (Weisbord, 1962)
Bittum caribense (Weisbord, 1962) 
Retilaskeya emersonii (Adams, 1838)
Cerithiopsis greni (Adams, 1850)
Cerithiopsis latum (Adams, 1850)
Seila adamsi (Orbigny, 1842)

Triphoridae
Strobiligera sentoma (Dall, 1927)
Triphora intermedia (Adams, 1850)
Triphora ornata (Deshayes, 1832) 
Triphora turristhomae (Holten, 1802)

Superfamily Trochoidea

Areneidae
Arene tricarinata (Stearns, 1872)

Phasianellidae
Gabrielona brevis Orbigny, 1842
Gabrielona bruscasensi Weisbord, 1962
Eulithidium adamsi (Philippi, 1853)
Tricolia brevis (Orbigny, 1842)
Eulithidium affine (Adams, 1850)
Eulithidium thalassicola Robertson, 1958
Eulithidium tessellatum (Potiez y Hichaud, 1838)

Trochidae

Astele hassler (Clench & Aguayo, 1939)
Astele bullisi (Clench & Turner, 1960)
Calliostoma adspersum (Philippi, 1851)
Calliostoma decipiens (Guppy, 1867)
Calliostoma decipiens (Guppy, 1867)
Calliostoma euglyptum (Adams, 1854) 
Calliostoma jujubinum (Gmelin, 1791)
Calliostoma pulchrum (Adams, 1850)
Calliostoma sarcodum Dall, 1927
Cittarium pica (Linnaeus, 1758)
Gaza superba (Dall, 1881) 
Tegula excavata (Lamarck, 1822)
Tegula fasciata (Born, 1778)
Tegula hotessieriana (Orbigny, 1842)
Tegula lividomaculata Adams, 1845
Tegula puntagordana Weisbord, 1962
Tegula viridula (Gmelin, 1791)

Turbinidae
Astraea brevispina (Lamarck, 1822)
Astraea caelata (Gmelin, 1791)
Astraea castanea Gmelin, 1791
Astraea phoebia Röding, 1798
Astraea tecta americana (Gmelin 1791)
Astraea tecta tecta (Solander 1786)

Astraea tuber (Linnaeus, 1767)
Astraea tuber venezuelensis (Flores y Cáceres, 1980)
Liotia variabilis  Dall 1889
Turbo canaliculatus Hermann, 1781
Turbo castanea Gmelin, 1791
Turbo crenulatus Gmelin 1791

Turridae
Crassispira albomaculata (Orbigny, 1842) 
Crassispira chazaliei (Dautzemberg, 1900)
Crassispira fuscenscens Reeve, 1843
Knefastia jungi Macsotay & Campos, 2001
Crassispira leucocyna Dall, 1883
Daphnella lymneiformis Kiener, 1840
Drillia albinodonta
Drillia gibbosa (Born, 1778)
Fusiturrieula pauletae Princz, 1978
Hindsiclava consors (Sowerby)
Knefastia altenai Macsotay & Campos, 2001
Mangelia melanitica Dall, 1885
Polystira albida (Perry, 1811)
Polystira tellea (Dall, 1889)
Pygospira ostrearum Stearns, 1872
Pyrgocythara candidissima (Adams, 1845)

Superfamily Truncatelloidea

Tornidae
Macrophalina floridana Moore, 1965

Vitrinellidae
Agatrix smithii (Dall, 1888) 
Circulus multistriatus (A. E. Verrill, 1884) 
Cochliolepis sunrinamensis  Altena, 1966
Cochliopsis parasitica  Stimpson, 1858
Cyclotremiscus caraboboense  Weisbord, 1962
Teinostoma clavium  Pilsbry y Mcginty, 1945
Teinostoma lerema Pilsbry y Mcginty, 1945
Teinostoma megastoma (Adams, 1850)
Teinostoma multistriata A. E. Verrill, 1884
Teinostoma obsoletun Pilsbry y Mcginty, 1945
Teinostoma parvicallum Pilsbry y Mcginty, 1945

Vitrinellidae
Vitrinella multistriata (A. E. Verrill, 1884)

Superfamily Turbinelloidea

Costellariidae
Vexillum puella (Reeve, 1848)

Turbinellidae

Turbinella angulata (Lightfoot, 1786)
Turbinella laevigata Anton 1838
Vasun capitellum (Linnaeus, 1758) 
Vasum ceramicum (Linnaeus, 1758) (Introduced species)
Vasum muricatum (Born, 1778)

Superfamily Umbraculoidea

Umbraculidae

Umbraculum plicatulum (Von Martens, 1881) (Introduced species)

Superfamily Vanikoroidea

Eulimidae
Melanella coniodea Kurt y Stimpson, 1851
Melanella intermedia (Cantraine, 1835)

Hipponicidae
Hipponix anticuatus (Linnaeus, 1767)
Hipponix incurvus (Gmelin, 1791)
Hipponix subrufus Lamarck, 1819

Superfamily Vermetoidea

Vermetidae
Petaloconchus erectus (Dall 1888)
Petaloconchus megintyi Olssony Harbison 1953
Petaloconchus nigricans (Dall, 1984)
Petaloconchus varians (Orbigny, 1841)
Serpulorbis decussatus (Gmelin, 1791)
Spiruglifus irregularis  (Orbigny, 1841)

Superfamily Volutoidea

Cancellariidae
Cancellaria reticulata (Linnaeus, 1767)
Olsonella smithii (Dall, 1889)

Marginellidae
Gibberulina agger (Watson, 1886)
Gibberulina ovuliformis (Orbigny, 1842)
Hyalina albolineata (Orbigny, 1842)
Hyalina avena (Kiener, 1834)
Hyalina gracilis (C.B.Adams, 1851)
Hyalina laenilata (Mörch, 1860)
Hyalina palida (Linnaeus, 1758)
Hyalina taeniota (Sowerby, 1846)
Marginella apacina Menke, 1828
Marginella aureocinta Searns, 1872
Marginella carnea (Storer, 1837)
Marginella catenata (Montagu, 1803)
Marginella clovere (Rios & Matthws, 1972)
  Marginella ebruneola Conrad, 1834
  Marginella hematita (Kiener, 1834)
Marginella lasallei
Marginella lavalleana Orbigny, 1842
Marginella prunum (Gmelin, 1791)
Marginella circumvitata Weisbord, 1962
Marginella marginata  Born, 1778
Marginellopsis serai Bavay, 1911
Persicula interruptolineata (Muhlfeld, 1816) 
Persicula obesa (Redfield, 1848)
Persicula muralis (Hinds, 1844)
Persicula porcellana (Gmelin, 1791)
Persicula pulcherina (Gaskoim, 1849)
Prunun rooselvelti (Bartsch & Rehder, 1939)
Volvarina lactea (Kiener, 1841)

Volutidae

Voluta musica Linnaeus, 1758

Superfamily Xenophoroidea

Xenophoridae
Tugurium longleyi (Bartsch, 1931)
Xenophora conchyliophora (Born, 1780)

Class Bivalvia

Superfamily Anomioidea

Anomiidae
Anomia simplex Orbigny, 1842
Anomia ephippium Linnaeus, 1758
Pododesmus rudis (Broderip, 1834)

Placunidae
Placuna placenta Linnaeus, 1758 (Introduced species)

Superfamily  Arcoidea

Arcidae

Barbatia domingensis (Lamarck, 1819)
Anadara brasiliana (Lamarck, 1819)
Anadara notabilis (Röding, 1798)
Anadara ovalis (Bruguière, 1789)
Anadara transversa (Say, 1822)
Arca imbricata Bruguière, 1789
Arca pacifica (Sowerby I, 1833) (Introduced species)
Arca zebra (Swainson, 1833) 
Arcopsis adamsi (Dall, 1886)
Barbatia cancellaria (Lamarck, 1819)
Barbatia candida (Helbling, 1779)
Barbatia tenera (Adams, 1845)
Noetia bisulcata (Lamarck, 1819)
Noetia ponderosa (Say, 1822)
Scapharca axelelssoni Macsotay & Campos, 2001
Scapharca baughmani Hertlein, 1951
Scapharca chemnitzii (Philippi, 1851)
Scapharca crassissima Macsotay & Campos, 2001
Scapharca lienosa (Say, 1863)
Scapharca lienosa floridana (Conrad, 1869)

Cardiidae

Americardia guppyi Thiele, 1910
Americardia media (Linnaeus, 1758)
Crassinella martinicensis (Orbigny, 1842)
Laevicardium laevigatum (Linnaeus, 1758)
Laevicardium sybariticum Dall 1886
Microcardium tinctum (Dall, 1881)
Papyridea hiatus (Mauschen, 1787)
Papyridea soleniformis (Bruguière, 1789
Trachycardium isocardia (Linnaeus, 1758)
Trachycardium egmontianum  (Shuttleworth, 1856)
Trachycardium muricatum (Linnaeus, 1758)
Trigonocardia antillarum (Orbigny, 1842)
Trigonocardia media (Linnaeus, 1758)

Carditidae
Carditamera floridana (Linnaeus, 1767)
Carditamera gracilis (Shuttleworth, 1856)

Chamidae
Arcinella arcinella (Unneo, 1767)
Arcinella corneta Conrad, 1866
Chama congregata Conrad, 1833
Chama florida Lamarck, 1819
Chama lactuca Dall, 1886
Chama macerophylla (Gmelin, 1791)
Chama sarda Reeve, 1847
Cyclocardia armilla (Dall, 1903)
Glyptoactis wendellwoodringi (Weisbord, 1964)
Pseudochama radians (Lamarck, 1819)

Condylocardiidae
Carditopsis guppy Maury

Corbiculidae
Corbicula fluminalis  (Múller, 1774) (Introduced species)

Corbulidae

Corbula aequivalvis Philippi, 1836
Corbula caribaea Orbigny, 1842
Corbula caribaea lavalleana Orbigny, 1842
Corbula contracta Say, 1822
Corbula dietziana Adams, 1852
Corbula disparilis Orbigny, 1845
Corbula lasalleana Orbigny, 1842
Polymesoda arctacta (Philippi, 1846)

Crassatellidae

Crasinella martinicensis Orbigny, 1842
Eucrassatella antillarum (Reeve, 1842)
Eucrassatella antillarum montserratensis (Maury, 1925)
Eucrassatella speciosa (Adams, 1852)

Cuspidariidae
Cardiomya glypta Bush 1896
Cardiomya perrostrata Dall, 1881

Cyrenoididae
Cyrenoide floridana (Dall, 1889)

Donacidae

Donax clathratus (Reeve, 1854) (Introduced species)
Donax denticulatus Linnaeus, 1758
Donax striatus Linnaeus, 1767
Donax higuerotensis
Donax varibilis texasianus Philippi, 1847
Iphigenia brasiliana (Lamarck, 1818)

Dreissenidae
Congreria lioeblichi Shütt, 1991
Mytilopsis dominguensis Récluz, 1852
Mytilopsis sallei Récluz, 1849

Glycymeridae
Glycymeris castaneus Lamarck,
Glycymeris decussata  (Linnaeus, 1758)
Glycymeris maculata (Broderip, 1832)
Glycymeris pectinata (Gmelin, 1791)
Glycymeris tesellata  (Sowerby, 1833)
Glycymeris undata  (Linnaeus, 1758)

Isognomonidae

Isognomon alatus (Gmelin, 1791)
Isognomon bicolor (Adams, 1845)
Isognomon oblicua (Lamarck, 1818)
Isognomon radiatus (Anton, 1839)
Isognomon vulsella (Lamarck, 1818)
Isognomon vulselloides Macsotay & Campos, 2001

Lasaeidae
Lasaea magallanica Carceles

Limidae
Acesta bullisi (H.E. Vokes, 1963)
Lima lima (Linnaeus, 1758)
Lima pellucida Adams, 1846
Lima scabra (Born, 1778)
Lima scabra tenera (Sowerby, 1843)
Limatula setifera Dall, 1886

Lucinidae

Anodontia alba Link, 1807
Codakia costata (Orbigny, 1842)
Codakia orbicularis (Linnaeus, 1758)
Codakia orbiculata (Montagu, 1808)
Divaricella quadrisulcata (Orbigny, 1842)
Lucina ephreimi Weisbord, 1964
Lucina katherinepalmerae Weisbord, 1964
Lucina muricata (Spengler, 1798)
Lucina nassula (Conrad, 1846)
Lucina pectinata (Gmelin, 1791)
Lucina pensylvanica (Linnaeus, 1758)* 
Lucina radians (Conrad, 1841)
Lucina trisulcata (Dall & Simpson, 1901)
Parvilucina blanda (Dall & Simpson, 1901
Parvilucina multilineata (Tuomey & Holmes, 1857)

Lyonsiidae
Entodesma weisbprdi Macsotay & Campos, 2001
Lyonsia beana Orbigny, 1842
Lyonsia hyalina floridana Conrad, 1849

Mactridae
Anatina anatina (Spengler, 1802)
Mactra fragilis Gmelin, 1791
Mactrellona alata (Spengler, 1802)
Mactronella exoleta (Gray, 1837) (Introduced species)
Mactrellona iheringi (Dall, 1897)
Mulinia cleryana (Orbigny, 1846)
Raeta plicatella (Lamarck, 1818)
Rangia flexuosa (Conrad, 1839)
Rangia mendica (Gold, 1851) (Introduced species)

Malleidae
Malleus candeanus  (Orbigny, 1842)

Mesodesmatidae
Ervilia concentrica (Holmes 1860)
Ervilia nitens (Montagu, 1806)
Ervilia nitens venezuelana Weisbord, 1964

Myidae
Sphenia antillensis Dall & Simpson, 1901

Mytilidae

Amydalum papyrium (Conrad, 1846)
Botula fusca (Gmelin, 1791)
Brachidontes modiolus (Linnaeus, 1767)
Brachidontes exustus (Linnaeus, 1758)
Brachidontes dominguensis (Lamarck, 1819)
Crenella abbotti Altena, 1968
Crenella decusata (Montagu, 1808)
Crenella divaricata (Orbigny, 1842)
Gregariella coralliophaga (Gmelin, 1791)< (Introduced species) 
Ischadium recuroum (Rafinesque, 1820)
Lithopaga aristata (Dilwyn, 1817)
Lithopaga bisulcata (Orbigny, 1842)
Lithopaga nigra (Orbigny, 1842)
Modiolus americanus (Leach, 1815)
Modiolus ficoides Macsotay  & Campos, 2001
Modiolus squamosus Beauperthuy, 1967
Musculista senhousia  (Benson, 1842) (Introduced species)
Musculus lateralis (Say, 1822)
Mytella maracaibensis Beaperthuy 1967
Perna perna (Linnaeus, 1758) (Introduced species) 
Perna viridis (Linnaeus, 1767) (Introduced species)
Ryenella lateralis (Say, 1821)

Nuculanidae
Adrana gloriosa Adams
Adrana tellinoides (Sowerby, 1823)
Nuculana acuta (Conrad, 1831)
Nuculana carpenteri  (Dall, 1881)
Nuculana cestrota  (Dall,1890)
Nuculana concentrica  (Say, 1824)
Nuculana dalmasi  Dautzenberg & Fischer 1897
Saccella jamaisensis (Orbigny, 1845)

Nuculidae
Nucula crenulata Adams, 1835
Nucula dalmasi Dautzenberg, 1900
Nucula mareana Weisbord, 1964.
Nucula semiornata Orbigny,1842

Ostreidae

Crassostrea rhizophorae (Guilding, 1828)
Crassostrea virginica (Gmeling, 1791) 
Ostrea caboblanquensis Weisbord, 1964
Ostrea cristata Born, 1778
Ostrea equestris Say, 1834
Ostrea libella Weisbord, 1964
Ostrea lixula Weisbord, 1964
Ostrea puelchana (Orbigny, 1841)
Ostrea spreta (Orbigny, 1845)
Lopha folium (Linnaeus, 1758)
Lopha frons (Linnaeus, 1758) 
Lopha gibsonsmithi Macsotay & Campos, 2001

Pandoridae
Pandora arenosa Conrad, 1834
Pandora bushiniana Dall, 1886

Pectinidae

Amusium glyptus (A. E. Verrill, 1882)
Amusium laurenti (Gmelin, 1791)
Amusium papyraceum (Gabb, 1873)
Aequipecten acanthodes (Dall, 1925)
Aequipecten lineolaris (Lamarck, 1819)
Aequipecten mucosus (Wood, 1828)
Argopecten gibbus (Linnaeus, 1758)
Argopecten imitatoides Macsotay & Campos 2001b
Argopecten noronhensis (A.E. Smith, 1885)
Argopecten nucleus (Born, 1778)
Argopecten irradian amplicostatus Dall, 1898
Chlamys benedecti A. E. Verrill & Bush,
Chlamys imbricata (Gmelin, 1791)
Chlamys muscosa (Wood, 1828)
Chlamys ornata (Lamarck, 1819)
Leptopecten bavayi (Dauzemberg, 1900)
Lyropecten antillarum (Récluz, 1853)
Lyropecten nodosus (Linnaeus, 1758)
Pecten amusoides Campos, 2001
Pecten ziczac (Linnaeus, 1758)
Pecten ziczac caboblanquensis (Druckerman & Weisbord, 1964) 
Semipallium antillarum (Récluz, 1853)

Periplomatidae
Cochlodesma leanum Conrad, 1831
Periploma compresa Orbigny, 1845
Periploma inequale (Adams, 1842) 
Periploma margaritacea (Lamarck, 1801)

Petricolidae
Petricola inversa Macsotay & Campos, 2001
Petricola lapicida ((Gmelin, 1791)
Petricola tipica (Jonas, 1844)
Rupellaria typica (Jonas, 1844)

Pholadidae
Barnea truncata (Say, 1822)
Cyrtopleura costata (Linnaeus, 1758)
Martesia fragilis A. E. Verrill y Bush, 1890
Martesia cuneiformis (Say, 1822)
Martesia cuneiformis (Linnaeus, 1756)
Pholas campechiensis Gmelin, 1791

Pinnidae

Atrina bitteri Gibson-Smith
Atrina rigida (Lightfoot, 1786)
Atrina seminuda (Lamark, 1819)
Atrina serrata  (Sowerby, 1825) 
Atrina venezuelana 
Pinna carnea Gmelin, 1791
Pinna rudis 

Plicatulidae
Plicatula gibbosa Lamarck, 1801
Plicatula penicillata Carpenter, 1856

Pteriidae

Pteria attilatomasi Macsotay & Campos, 2001
Pteria colymbus (Réiding, 1798)
Pteria hirundo (Linnaeus, 1758) (Introduced species)
Pinctada imbricata Réiding, 1798
Pinctada radiata Leach, 1814

Sanguinolariidae

Asaphis deflorata (Linnaeus, 1758)
Heterodonax bimaculatus (Linnaeus, 1758)
Sanguinolaria cruenta (Lightfoot, 1786)
Sanguinolaria sanguinolaria (Gmelin, 1791)

Semelidae
Conungia coarctata Sowerby, 1833
Cumingia lamellosa (Sowerby, 1833)  (Introduced species)
Semele bellastriata Conrad, 1847
Semele bellastriata donovani McGinty, 1555
Semele proficua (Pulteney, 1799)
Semele purpuracens (Gmelin, 1791)
Semele radiata Say,

Solecurtidae
Tagelus divisus (Spengler, 1794)
Tagelus plebeius (Lightfoot, 1786)

Solenidae
Solen obliquus Spengler, 1794
Solen rosewateri Altena, 1971
Solecurtis sanctaemarthae Orbigny, 1842

Spondylidae
Spondylus americanus Hermann, 1781
Spondylus ictericus Reeve, 1856

Sportellidae
Basterotia elliptica (Récluz, 1850) 
Basterotia quadrata (Hinds, 1843)

Tellinidae

Arcophagia fausta (Pulteney, 1799)
Florimetis intastriata (Say, 1826)
Macoma brasiliana Dall
Macoma brevifrons (Say, 1834)
Macoma cleryana (Orbigny, 1846)
Macoma constricta (Bruguière, 1792)
Macoma pseudomera Dall & Simpson, 1901
Macoma tageliformis Dall, 1900
Psammotreta brevifrons (Say, 1834)
Psammotreta intastriata (Say, 1827)
Strigilla carnaria (Linnaeus, 1758)
Strigilla pisiformis (Linnaeus, 1758)
Strigilla producta Tryon, 1870
Strigilla pseudocarnaria Boss, 1969 (Introduced species) 
Strigilla rombergii (Mörch, 1853)
Tellidora cristata (Récluz, 1842) 
Tellina alternata Say, 1822
Tellina camachoi Macsotay & Campos 2001b
Tellina consobrina D´Orbigny
Tellina cristalina Spengler, 1798
Tellina exerythra Boss, 1964
Tellina fausta Pultency, 1799
Tellina gouldii Hanley, 1846
Tellina juttingae Altena, 1960
Tellina nitens Adams, 1845
Tellina laevigata Linnaeus, 1758
Tellina lineata Turton, 1819
Tellina listeri Röding, 1798
Tellina mera Say, 1834
Tellina probina Boss, 1964
Tellina punicea Born, 1778
Tellina radiata Linnaeus, 1758
Tellina sandix Boss, 1968
Tellina similaris Sowerby, 1806
Tellina sybaritica Dall, 1881
Tellina tirata Turton, 1819

Teredinidae
Lyodus pedicellatus (Quaterfages, 1849) (Introduced species)
Bankia carinata (Gray, 1827 (Introduced species)
Bankia fimbriatulla Moll & Roch, 1931
Bankia martensi Stempel 1899 (Introduced species)
Neoteredo
Teredo

Thraciidae
Cyathodonta magnifica Jonas, 1850
Cyathodonta semirugosa (Reeve, 1859)
Thracia distorta (Montagu, 1808) (Introduced species)

Trapeziidae
Coralliophaga coralliophaga (Gmelin, 1791)

Ungulinidae
Diplodonta candeana (Orbigny, 1842)
Diplodonta notata (Dall & Simpson, 1901)
Diplodonta punctata (Say, 1822) 
Diplodonta semiaspera (Philippi, 1836)

Veneridae
Anomalocardia brasiliana (Gmelin, 1791)
Anomalocardia cuneimeris Conrad, 1846
Callista eusymata (Dall, 1890) 
Chione cancellata (Linnaeus, 1767)
Chione constricta Macsotay 1968
Chione cultellata Weisbord, 1964
Chione granulata (Conrad, 1841)
Chione intapurpurea (Conrad, 1849)
Chione latilirata (Conrad, 1841)
Chione mamoense Weisbord, 1964
Chione paphia (Linnaeus, 1767)
Chione pubera (Bory-Saint-Vicent, 1827)
Chione riomaturensis Maury, 1925
Chione subrostrata (Lamarck, 1818) 
Cincomphalus strigillinus (Dall, 1902)  (Introduced species)
Clausinella gayi (Hupé, 1854) (Introduced species)
Clausinella fasciata (Da Costa, 1778)  (Introduced species)
Cyclinella tenuis (Récluz, 1852)
Dosinia concentrica (Born, 1778)
Dosinia elegans Conrad, 1846
Gemma gemma (Totten, 1934)
Gouldia venezuelana Weisbord, 1964
Macrocallista maculata (Linnaeus, 1758)
Periglypta listeri (Gray, 1838)
Pitar albidus (Gmelin, 1791)
Pitar arestus (Dall y Simpson, 1901)
Pitar bermudez Macsotay & campos, 2001
Pitar circinatus (Born, 1778)
Pitar dione (Linnaeus, 1758)
Pitar fulminatus (Menke, 1828)
Protothaca granulata (Gmelin, 1791)
Protothaca pectorina (Lamarck, 1818) 
Tivela mactroides (Born, 1778)
Transenella caboblanquensis Weisbord, 1964
Transenella conradiata Dall, 1902
Transenella culebrana (Dall & Simpson, 1901)
Transenella stimpsoni Dall, 1902
Ventricolaria listeroides (Linnaeus, 1758)
Ventricolaria rigida (Dillwyn, 1817)
Ventricolaria rugatina (Helprinn, 1887)

Verticordiidae
Verticordia ornata

Class Cephalopoda 
Argonautidae

Argonauta argo (Linnaeus, 1758)

Loliginidae
Loligo pealei Lesueur 1821
Lolliguncula brevis (Blainville, 1823)
Sepioteuthis sepioidea (Blainville, 1823)

Octopodidae
Octopus briareus Robson, 1919
Octopus burryi Voss, 1950
Octopus defilippis Verany, 1851
Octopus hummelincki Adam, 1936
Octopus joubini Robson, 1929
Octopus vulgaris Cuvier, 1797
Octopus zonatus Voss, 1968

Spirulidae
Spirula spirula (Linnaeus, 1758)

Thysanoteuthidae
Thysanoteuthys rhombus Troschel, 1857

See also
 List of echinoderms of Venezuela
 List of echinoderms of Venezuela
 List of Poriferans of Venezuela
 List of introduced molluscs of Venezuela
 List of molluscs of Falcón state, Venezuela
 List of non-marine molluscs of El Hatillo Municipality, Miranda, Venezuela
 List of non-marine molluscs of Venezuela
 List of birds of Venezuela
 List of mammals of Venezuela

References

External links
 PDF: Rubro Moluscos / Ministerio del Poder Popular para la Agricultura y Tierra (Spanish)
 Diaz Diaz, Oscar y Linero-Arana, Ildefonso. Comunidad de moluscos asociados a praderas de Thalassia Testudinum (Bank Et Köning 1805), en la bahia de Mochima, Venezuela. ACV, 2004, vol.55, no.1, p.44-55. .
 PDF: Sioliz Villafranca & Mayré Jiménez. 2006: Comunidad de moluscos asociados al mejillón verde Perna viridis (Mollusca: Bivalvia) y sus relaciones tróficas en la costa norte de la Península de Araya, Estado Sucre, Venezuela. Rev. Biol. Trop. (Int. J. Trop. Biol.) Vol. 54 (Suppl. 3): 135-144, .
 PDF: FREDDY AROCHA. Cephalopod Resources of Venezuela

marine
Molluscs
Venezuela
marine molluscs
Venezuela, Marine
Venezuela